Clube Atlético Paranaibense, commonly known as Paranaibense, is a Brazilian football team based in Paranaíba, Mato Grosso do Sul.

History
The club was founded on 7 September 1986. They finished in the second position in the Campeonato Sul-Mato-Grossense Second Level in 2006, losing the competition to Corumbaense.

Stadium
Clube Atlético Paranaibense play their home games at Estádio Jaime Queiroz Carvalho, nicknamed Jaimão. The stadium has a maximum capacity of 5,000 people.

References

Association football clubs established in 1986
Football clubs in Mato Grosso do Sul
1986 establishments in Brazil